A. J. LoCascio is an American actor, director and producer. He is known for his roles as Prince Lotor in Voltron: Legendary Defender and Marty McFly in Back to the Future: The Game.

Early life
Locascio grew up in New Jersey before moving to New York City where he attended the School of Visual Arts.

Career
In an interview for the release of Back to the Future: The Game, Locascio said that as a kid people used to say that he sounded like Marty McFly from Back to the Future. Since Michael J. Fox was unavailable to voice Marty (although he voiced Willie McFly and Future Marty in the episode "Outatime"), Locascio auditioned for the part and got it.

He has performed as a voice actor on other projects, along with directing, producing and working in the costume and wardrobe department. He was the co-host of the pilot of a nostalgia-heavy talk show called Yesterday Tonight.

Locascio also starred in a Minecraft web series called Seedlings as the main character, Mark.

He voiced Emmet Brickowski in the Legoland 4D short subject The Lego Movie: 4D - A New Adventure. This was because Chris Pratt was unavailable at that time.

Locascio voiced Prince Lotor (son of Emperor Zarkon) and James Griffin on Voltron: Legendary Defender.

Filmography

Film

Television

Video games

Theme parks

References

External links
Official website

Living people
Male actors from New Jersey
American male voice actors
American male video game actors
School of Visual Arts alumni
21st-century American male actors
Year of birth missing (living people)